Henry Gould may refer to:
 Henry Gould (priest), New Zealand churchman
 Henry W. Gould, American mathematician
 G. Henry P. Gould, American businessman, manufacturer, and politician from New York

See also
 Harry Gould (disambiguation)